The Men's 20 kilometre individual biathlon competition at the 1960 Winter Olympics was held on 21 February, at McKinney Creek Stadium. The firing ranges were located at the following points on the 20-kilometer course: 6.5 km — 200 meter range, 9.5 km — 250 meter range, 12.5 km — 150 meter range and 15 km — 100 meter range. The first three series were fired from a prone position, the last standing. Each miss of the target cost two minutes.

Results 

Klas Lestander became the first Olympic biathlon champion on the back of a perfect shooting performance, the only one of the event. The victory came despite Lestander's ski time, which was only 15th, right in the middle of the 30-man field. The defending world champion, Vladimir Melanin, had the third fastest ski time, but eight minutes in penalties left him fourth. the other medals went to racers with some of the better shooting performances; Antti Tyrväinen took just four minutes in penalties for silver, and Aleksandr Privalov only  six minutes to win bronze. The two fastest skiers were Frenchmen Victor Arbez and René Mercier, both more than two minutes ahead of Privalov, and more than seven ahead of Lestander. However, both struggled on the range, Mercier missing 15 of 20 shots to incur a half-hour in penalties, and Abrez 18 of 20 to add 36 minutes to his time.

References

Biathlon at the 1960 Winter Olympics